The North-Urengoyskoye gas field is a natural gas field located in the Yamalo-Nenets Autonomous Okrug. It was discovered in 1966 and developed by and Novatek. It began production in 1970 and produces natural gas and condensates. According to Climate Trace it is the largest single source of greenhouse gas emissions by Russia.

References

natural gas fields in Russia
natural gas fields in the Soviet Union